The Maastricht Exhibition & Conference Centre (shortened as MECC Maastricht) is a convention centre in Maastricht, Netherlands, located in the city's Randwyck district. It is well-known for hosting the annual European Fine Art Fair (TEFAF), which is considered one of the world's leading art fairs. MECC Maastricht was a shortlisted candidate to host the Eurovision Song Contest 2020, losing to Rotterdam Ahoy.

Gallery

See also
 List of convention centres in the Netherlands

External links

 

Convention centres in the Netherlands
Buildings and structures in Maastricht